New Grass Revival is the seventh studio album by the progressive bluegrass band New Grass Revival, released in 1986.

Track listing
 "What You Do To Me" (Hall)
 "Love Someone Like Me" (Holly Dunn, Radney Foster)
 "Lonely Rider" (Flynn)
 "Sweet Release" (Flynn)
 "How Many Hearts" (Flynn)
 "In The Middle of the Night" (Flynn)
 "Saw You Running" (Thom Moore)
 "Ain´t That Peculiar" (Pete Moore, Robinson, Rogers)
 "Seven By Seven" (Fleck)
 "Revival" (Rowan)

Personnel
Sam Bush – guitar, mandolin, fiddle, vocals
Pat Flynn – guitar, vocals
Béla Fleck – banjo, vocals 
John Cowan – vocals, bass

Additional musicians:
Eddie Bayers – drums
Bob Mater – drums
Tom Roady – percussion

Production notes
Garth Fundis – producer
Denny Purcell – mastering
Gary Laney – engineer
Caroline Greyshock – photography
Henry Marquez – art direction

Chart performance

References

1986 albums
New Grass Revival albums
Albums produced by Garth Fundis
Capitol Records albums